Cristóbal Guillermo Henríquez Villagra (born 7 August 1996) is a Chilean chess player. He was awarded the Grandmaster title by FIDE in 2017, at the age of 20.

Career
He was awarded the title of International Master following his win in the 2013 Pan-American Youth chess championship in Brazil.

He was runner-up in the 2014 Chilean championship, and won it in 2015. Henríquez Villagra won the 2014 Pan American junior championship. He played third board for Chile at the 2014 Chess Olympiad in Tromsø, Norway, scoring 6.5/9. In the 2014 World Under-18 championship he finished in a tie for third. 

In 2015 he finished in a tie for second at the FIDE zonal in Asunción, then won the playoff against three Grandmasters to qualify for the FIDE World Cup in September of that year. At this event, he caused a major upset in the first round by defeating leading grandmaster Boris Gelfand in the rapid play-off.

In the 6th Arica Open in 2019 he tied 2nd-8th place with Jose Eduardo Martinez Alcantara, Deivy Vera Siguenas, Renato R. Quintiliano Pinto, Nikita Petrov, Salvador Alonso, and Diego Saul Rod Flores Quillas.

He was awarded the Grandmaster title in March 2017.

References

External links
 
 

1996 births
Living people
Chilean chess players
Chess grandmasters
Chess Olympiad competitors
Place of birth missing (living people)